"Let's Get Back to Bed – Boy!" is a song by German recording artist Sarah Connor. Written and produced by frequent collaborative duo Rob Tyger and Kay Denar, the song features American R&B singer TQ. Conceived for Connor's debut album, Green Eyed Soul (2001), the track is built around a mandolin sample and scratching hip hop beats, over which Connor, as the female protagonist, adopts sensual vocals and expresses her desire to have sex with her partner, inviting him to her bed.

The song was released as the album's lead single in German-speaking Europe on 7 May 2001. Its impact on the charts was large for a debut single; it reached the top ten in Germany, Austria and Switzerland and the top twenty in the United Kingdom and Norway. "Let's Get Back to Bed – Boy!" was nominated for Best National Single – Rock/Pop at the 2002 ECHO Awards, and received gold certifications from the German and Austrian arms of the International Federation of the Phonographic Industry.

Music video
A music video was filmed for the song, featuring both Connor and TQ. The video begins at a large mansion, where Connor is in the bathtub. A party is happening downstairs, and we see TQ arriving and mingling with various women. Connor finishes getting ready and heads downstairs, catching the attention of TQ and the other guests. Connor and TQ then retire to the bedroom to engage in sexual intercourse, implied through the removal of clothing and the pair embracing. The video ends with Connor and TQ leaving the house and heading towards their car, before deciding they are not quite finished in the bedroom, heading back inside whilst embracing and laughing together.

Track listings
German CD single
 "Let's Get Back to Bed – Boy!" (radio/video Klimax) – 3:57
 "Let's Get Back to Bed – Boy!" (club remix radio 4Play) – 3:58
 "Let's Get Back to Bed – Boy!" (Sly's Dub Remix Chill Out) – 4:17
 "Let's Get Back to Bed – Boy!" (club remix main part) – 5:25

European CD single
 "Let's Get Back to Bed – Boy!" (radio/video Klimax) – 3:57
 "Let's Get Back to Bed – Boy!" (club remix radio 4Play) – 3:58

UK CD single
 "Let's Get Back to Bed – Boy!" – 3:57
 "Let's Get Back to Bed – Boy!" (Blacksmith R&B 12-inch rub) – 5:20
 "Let's Get Back to Bed – Boy!" (Sly's Dub Remix Chill Out) – 4:17
 "Let's Get Back to Bed – Boy!" (club remix main part) – 5:25
 "Let's Get Back to Bed – Boy!" (video)

UK cassette single
 "Let's Get Back to Bed – Boy!" – 3:57
 "Let's Get Back to Bed – Boy!" (Blacksmith R&B radio rub) – 3:58
 "Let's Get Back to Bed – Boy!" (club remix radio) – 3:58

Charts

Weekly charts

Year-end charts

Certifications

Release history

References

2001 debut singles
2001 songs
Sarah Connor (singer) songs
Songs written by Kay Denar
Songs written by Rob Tyger
TQ (singer) songs
X-Cell Records singles